The partial list of political families of Gujarat state of India.

The Gaekwad family
Fatehsinghrao Gaekwad, Maharaja of Baroda
Ranjitsinh Pratapsinh Gaekwad, brother of Fatehsinghrao Gaekwad

The Kanodia family
 Mahesh Kanodia, Former Member of Parliament
 Naresh Kanodia, Former Member of Legislative Assembly
 Hitu Kanodia, Member of Legislative Assembly

The Korat family
 Savjibhai Korat, Former Cabinet Minister.
 Jashumatiben Korat, Former State Minister and Vice President of BJP Gujarat unit.
 Prashant Korat, BJP Youth District President 

The Patel family
Chimanbhai Patel Family
 Chimanbhai Patel, Former Chief Minister of Gujarat.
 Siddharth Patel, Former Member of Legislative Assembly, Former President of Gujarat Pradesh Congress Committee.

Keshubhai Patel Family
 Keshubhai Patel, Former Chief Minister of Gujarat.
 Bharat Patel, BJP member.

The Patel family Of Ikhar
Kika Patel
 Ibrahim Ali Patel, MLA - Indian National Congress
 Juned Patel , Indian Politician

The Radadiya family
 Vitthal Radadiya, Former State Minister and Member of Parliament
 Jayesh Radadiya, State Minister.

The Sanghani family
 Dileep Sanghani, Former Cabinet Minister.
 Manish Sanghani, President Sardar Patel Group.

The Solanki family
Madhavsinh Solanki Family
 Madhavsinh Solanki, Former Chief-Minister.
Bharatsinh Madhavsinh Solanki, Former Union Minister, Former Member of Parliament.

Purshottam Solanki Family
 Purshottam Solanki, State Minister.
 Hirabhai Solanki, MLA.

 
Gujarat